Edi Gotlieb (or Gotliv, ; born 16 August 1992) is an Israeli professional footballer who plays as a centre-back for Israeli Premier League club Hapoel Tel Aviv.

Early and personal life
Gotlieb was born in Karmi'el, Israel. 

He also holds a Russian passport as Eduard Eduardovich Gotlib, and was registered with the Russian Premier League as a local player.

In May 2021, he married Israeli cosmetician Natali ( Levi).

Club career
On 5 August 2019, he signed with Russian Premier League club FC Orenburg. His Orenburg contract was terminated by mutual consent on 3 August 2020.

International career 
He has been an Israel under-21 international since between 2011 and 2013.

He was called up for the senior Israel national team in October 2021, during their 2022 FIFA World Cup qualifiers - UEFA.

References

External links
 

1992 births
Living people
Israeli footballers
Association football central defenders
Israel under-21 international footballers
Hapoel Acre F.C. players
Hapoel Tel Aviv F.C. players
FC Orenburg players
Israeli Premier League players
Liga Leumit players
Russian Premier League players
Israeli expatriate footballers
Expatriate footballers in Russia
Israeli expatriate sportspeople in Russia
Footballers from Karmiel
Israeli people of Russian descent
Israeli people of Soviet descent
Russian people of Israeli descent